Bagong Liwanag (Tagalog for "New Light") is an EP and the 11th overall album of the Filipino pop rock band, Rivermaya. It has 5 main tracks, 5 instrumental tracks and 2 audio messages which also included demos of songs from their upcoming album. It was released under Warner Music Philippines and released on August 15, 2007.

The carrier single "Sayang" was released weeks after the departure of Rico Blanco from the band after serving as the band's chief songwriter, keyboardist, guitarist and vocalist for 13 years.

Track listing

Personnel 
Japs Sergio – lead vocals (tracks 1 & 5), bass, backing vocals
Mark Escueta – lead vocals (tracks 2 & 4), drums & percussion, backing vocals
Mike Elgar – lead vocals (track 3), guitar, keyboards, backing vocals

Additional musicians
Champ Lui Pio – acoustic guitar (track 5)
DJ Rodriguez – tambourine (track 5)

Album credits 
Executive Producer: Revolver Music, Lizza Nakpil & Chito S. Roño
Sound Engineer: Mark Escueta
Assistant Sound Engineers: Mike Elgar & Japs Sergio
Mastered By Angee Rozul at Tracks Studios
Sleeve By Paolo Lim
Artist Photography by Nina Sandejas

References

External links

Rivermaya albums
2007 EPs